The Umina Beach Bunnies  is a rugby league club based on the Central Coast, New South Wales region of Australia.

In 2017, the club entered two senior teams in the Newcastle & Hunter Rugby Leagues, a men's team in A Grade and a women's team in the Ladies League tag. The club entered 11 junior teams in the Central Coast Rugby League, from Under 6 to Under 14 age groups.

History
Umina Beach Bunnies were formed in 1961.

Umina won their inaugural First Grade Premiership in 1983, defeating Gosford in extra-time of a Grand Final Replay. At full-time in both matches the score was 10-all. In the first match there was no further score, but in the second Umina scored four tries in the twenty minutes to win. 26-10.

Umina won a second title in 1994, defeating Wyong by 32 points to 24.

Umina defeated Woy Woy, 22-14, to win their third First Grade Premiership in 2005.

Home ground
Col Gooley Oval, the oval adjacent to the Umina Beach SLSC (Surf Life Savers Club) is the home ground for the club.

Season summaries

Notable Juniors
Chris Heighington (2003-18 Wests Tigers, Cronulla Sharks & Newcastle Knights)
Brayden Wiliame (2013- Parramatta Eels & Manly Sea Eagles)
Nicho Hynes (2019- Melbourne Storm)

Honours and records

Team
 Premierships (3): 1983, 1994, 2005.
 Runners-up (8): 1974, 1980, 1984, 1985, 2004, 2006, 2007, 2012.
 Second / B / Reserve Grade (3): 1973, 1974, 2012.
 Third Grade (3): 1972, 1983, 1991.
 Under 19 (1): 1982.
 Under 18 (1): 1983.
 Under 17 (1): 2001.

Team Numbers 

Team numbers obtained and compiled from competition tables and match results published in the newspapers, Central Coast Express, Wyong Shire Advocate and Central Coast Express Advocate. Numbers for 2003 and 2011 taken from copies of the Central Coast Division Junior Rugby League Yearbook of those years, supplied by Toukley Hawks RLFC. Age groups Under 9 and younger not included as team numbers from 1985 to 2011 not known to the author.

See also 
 Central Coast Rugby League Competition

References

External links 
 Newcastle & Hunter Rugby League at SportsTG

Rugby clubs established in 1961
Rugby league teams in New South Wales
Sport on the Central Coast (New South Wales)